Margaret Nantongo Zziwa is a Ugandan politician and legislator. She served as the Speaker of the 3rd East African Legislative Assembly (EALA) in Arusha, Tanzania. She was elected to serve in that capacity in June 2012. She was impeached and voted out of office on 17 December 2014, on the basis of misconduct and abuse of office, but was later awarded compensation for illegal removal.

Background and education 
She was born to Charles Mugerwa and Josephine Mugerwa of Mpererwe, a suburb of Uganda's capital and largest city, Kampala, in 1963. Margaret Zziwa holds the degree of Bachelor of Arts in Economics and a Postgraduate Diploma in Education, both from Makerere University, Uganda's oldest institution of higher education. One of her master's degrees, obtained from Makerere as well, is the Master of Arts in Gender and Women Studies. She also holds another master's degree, the Master of Arts in Social Policy Studies, from the University of Stirling in the United Kingdom. Later, she was awarded a Doctor of Philosophy by the University of Stirling.

Work history 
Before joining politics, she taught economics and geography at Kololo Senior Secondary School, a high school in the centre of Kampala, which is Uganda's capital and largest city. She also served as a part-time lecturer in the Faculty of Women and Gender Studies at Makerere University.

Between 1993 and 1995, she served as a member of the Constituent Assembly that drafted the 1995 Ugandan Constitution. From 1996 until 2006, she served two consecutive terms in Uganda's Parliament as the Women's Member of Parliament for Kampala District.

Since 2007, she has served as one of the nine Ugandan legislators in the East African Legislative Assembly (EALA), the legislative arm of the East African Community. In June 2012, she was elected to serve as the speaker of the EALA for a five-year term.

Other responsibilities

Zziwa is a board member of St. Margaret Secondary School, a school she started. She is also a founder-member of St. Francis Choir at St. Jude Catholic Church at Naguru, another Kampala suburb.

Personal life

Zziwa is married to Francis Babu. They have four children together. She is of the Roman Catholic faith. She is a member of the National Resistance Movement, the ruling political party in Uganda since 1986.

References

External links 
  Uganda Parliament Names Nine Representatives To EALA
 Members of 3rd East African Legislative Assembly
 Uganda's Zziwa Replaces Abdi As EALA Speaker

Living people
Makerere University alumni
Ganda people
1963 births
Alumni of the University of Stirling
People from Kampala District
Ugandan Roman Catholics
National Resistance Movement politicians
20th-century Ugandan women politicians
20th-century Ugandan politicians
21st-century Ugandan women politicians
21st-century Ugandan politicians
Members of the East African Legislative Assembly